HMS Edgar was a 74-gun third-rate ship of the line of the Royal Navy, that saw service in the American Revolutionary, French Revolutionary and Napoleonic Wars. Launched in 1779, she fought in the battles of Cape St Vincent (in 1780) and Copenhagen (in 1801), two of the major naval engagements of the wars.

Edgar also saw service as flagship to two different admirals, and was the scene of a mutiny in 1808. After the end of her active career, she was employed as a prison ship before her 56-year life came to an end in 1835, when she was ordered to be broken up.

Construction
Edgar was ordered from Woolwich Dockyard on 25 August 1774. The Arrogant class of third rates was a development over Slade's previous , and a further nine ships were ordered from various yards, both Royal and commercial, to the same lines as Edgar. Originally, the Admiralty had intended to order her to be built to the lines of Sir John Williams' , specifically . Her keel was laid down on 26 August 1776, and she was launched on 30 June 1779.

A list composed in or around 1793, giving details of twelve Royal Navy ships, reveals that Edgar possessed a white figurehead, with details painted in red and black. Of the other eleven ships mentioned, seven had the plain white figureheads as completed by the dockyards, whilst four had painted theirs with a larger palette since being launched.

American Revolutionary War
Edgar was launched when Britain was embroiled in the American Revolutionary War. She commissioned under her first captain, John Elliot, in May 1779, while her first action came on 16 January 1780, when she fought in the Battle of Cape St Vincent as part of Admiral Sir George Rodney's fleet. After a two-hour chase, Edgar was one of the first ships to engage the numerically inferior Spanish fleet.

In November 1781, the Admiralty had received intelligence that a large convoy was preparing to sail from Brest under Admiral de Guichen. It was a convoy of transports carrying naval supplies for the West Indies and the French fleet in the East Indies. With the French naval escort to leeward of the convoy, Kempenfelt attacked immediately, capturing 15 of the transports before nightfall. The rest of the convoy scattered, most returning to Brest; only five transports reached the West Indies.

Her second major action came on 20 October 1782 when she was part of Admiral Richard Howe's fleet of 35 ships of the line at the Battle of Cape Spartel. The fleet had encountered the combined Franco-Spanish fleet of 46 ships of the line under Admiral Luis de Córdova y Córdova, and some exchange of fire took place before Admiral Howe ordered a retreat.

Edgar spent the remainder of the war in the Channel Fleet under Admiral George Darby.

Between the wars
After the conclusion of the war in 1783, Edgar was fitted for service as a guardship in Portsmouth Harbour. In 1787 Captain Charles Thompson took command, and in spring 1788 she served as Rear-Admiral John Leveson-Gower's flagship whilst he commanded his fleet of observation on its two-month cruise off the Irish coast and west of the Scilly Isles. At the end of this cruise, Edgar returned to Portsmouth where she resumed her role as guardship.

Edgar was recommissioned in April 1791 and joined the home fleet.

French Revolutionary War
After France's declaration of war against Great Britain brought the country into the French Revolutionary War in 1793, Edgar, under the command of Captain Bertie,  captured the French privateer Dumourier, which had earlier captured the Spanish ship Santa Jago (or St Jago), in April. Edgar was part of a squadron commanded by Admiral John Gell. A large amount of treasure was found on Dumourier valued at over £½ million. Edgar, and  escorted St Jago to Portsmouth. that escorted St Jago back to Portsmouth. The ownership of the Spanish ship was a matter of some debate and was not settled until 4 February 1795, when the value of the cargo was put at £935,000. At this time all the crew, captains, officers and admirals received a share of the prize money, with Admiral Hood's share standing at £50,000.

In 1794 the crew of  rose up in mutiny whilst the ship lay in Leith Roads. Edgar was ordered alongside Defiance, and if it were deemed necessary to restore order, to engage her. A comment left by one of Edgars crew suggests that had the order been given to fire, it would not have been obeyed, as the crew thought that the mutineers aboard Defiance were in the right.

In 1800 Edgar was part of the Channel Fleet under Admiral Sir Alan Gardner blockading the important French port of Brest. Edgar was driven from her station on blockade duty on 9 November by hurricane-force winds, and again put into Plymouth for repairs.
2 April 1801

On 2 April 1801, Edgar took part in the Battle of Copenhagen. After passing down the Outer Channel in order to negotiate the southern tip of the Middle Ground shoal off the coast from Copenhagen, Edgar was leading Vice-Admiral Horatio Nelson's line, and was the first to commence firing, as soon as she was in range of the Danish . Edgar was forced to fight unsupported for some time, as the next ship in line, had run aground on the poorly charted Middle Ground, requiring , the next in line after Agamemnon, to manoeuvre around the stranded ship. During the course of the battle, Edgar had 31 killed, including the First Lieutenant and three soldiers of the 49th Regiment, and 115 men were wounded.

Napoleonic Wars
The Revolutionary War was brought to an end on 25 March 1802 with the Treaty of Amiens, and war gave way to a period of uneasy peace. In June 1802 Edgar was taken into Chatham for repairs. She was recommissioned in 1805 as part of the doubling and bracing programme, and served as Admiral Lord Keith's flagship off Texel, blockading the Dutch coast. Edgar, along with several other ships, was in the Downs on 17 December, when  came in to shelter from gales that had blown up, hampering her progress to Chatham. Victory was returning to England after the Battle of Trafalgar, and on board was the body of the late Vice-Admiral Lord Nelson.

On 28 March 1808, there was an attempted mutiny on board whilst Edgar was lying in Cawsand Bay. The crew had all gathered on the quarter deck, but dispersed at the threat of a murderous volley from the ship's company of marines. Five men, including the captain of the main-top and the bosun's mate, were arrested and placed in irons. The five were tried for mutiny aboard  in the Hamoaze on 9 and 11 April. All were found guilty, despite attempts by Edgars petty officers to prove that they had been goaded into their actions by threats from the rest of the crew. Each of the men was sentenced to be flogged round the fleet, with the captain of the main-top, Henry Chesterfield, receiving a total of 700 lashes and two-years' solitary confinement; the bosun's mate, John Rowlands, received one-year's confinement and 300 lashes; two of the remaining men received 200 lashes each, and one 500 lashes.

Gunboat War
In May 1808 Edgar was one of the 12 ships of the line forming part of Vice-Admiral Sir James Saumarez's squadron sent to the Baltic after Denmark's declaration of war against Sweden. By this time, Sweden had allied herself with Britain, but both Denmark and Russia were allies of Buonaparte. Saumarez, who had his flag in Victory, was therefore tasked with keeping the Baltic open to British trade, and with promoting British interests in the region. The Gunboat War with Denmark lasted from 1807 until 1814.

When word of the uprising of the Spanish against the French in 1808 reached Denmark, some 12,000 Spanish troops stationed in Denmark and under the Marquis de la Romana decided that they wished to leave French service and return to Spain. They agreed a plan and on 9 August 1808 the Spaniards seized the fort and town of Nyborg. Keats then prepared to take possession of the port and to organize the departure of the Spanish. Keats informed the Danish authorities that if they did not impede the operation he would spare the town. The Danes agreed, except for the captains of two small Danish warships in the harbour.

On 11 August Keats sent in the boats from Edgar, under the command of her captain, James Macnamara. The boats captured the brig , of 18 guns and under the command of Otto Frederick Rasch, and the cutter Søormen, of 12 guns and under the command of Thøger Emil Rosenørn. Despite the odds Rasch and Rosenørn refused and put up a stiff resistance before they struck. British losses were an officer killed and two men wounded; the Danes lost seven men killed and 13 wounded. In 1847 the Admiralty authorized the issue of the Naval General Service Medal with clasp "11 Aug. Boat Service 1808" to all surviving claimants of the action.

The British organized the evacuation of the Spanish troops using some 50 or so local boats. Some 10,000 troops returned to Spain via Britain.

The gunboats (Husaren, Løberen, and Flink) sought refuge in Grenå, on eastern Jutland, where a company of soldiers and their field guns could provide cover. However, the British mounted a cutting out expedition of some 200 men in ten ships’ boats after midnight on 7 July, capturing the three gunboats.

Fate
Edgar was laid up in ordinary at Chatham in 1811. She underwent a conversion to serve as a prison hulk in 1813, and was renamed Retribution in 1815. She continued to serve in this role until 1835, when the decision was taken to have her broken up.

Notes

Citations

Bibliography

 Goodwin, Peter (2002). Nelson's Ships – A History of the Vessels in which he Served, 1771–1805. Conway Maritime Press. .
 Goodwin, Peter (2005). The Ships of Trafalgar: The British, French and Spanish Fleets October 1805. Conway Maritime Press. .
 Lavery, Brian (2000). Nelson's Navy: The Ships, Men and Organisation 1793–1815. Conway Maritime Press. .
 Lavery, Brian (2003). The Ship of the Line – Volume 1: The development of the battlefleet 1650–1850. Conway Maritime Press. .
Long, William H. (1895) Medals of the British navy and how they were won: with a list of those officers, who for their gallant conduct were granted honorary swords and plate by the Committee of the Patriotic Fund. (London: Norie & Wilson).
Mayo, John Horsley (1897) Medals and decorations of the British Army and Navy. (John Constable).
 Topsøe-Jensen, T. A. and Emil Marquard (1935) Officerer i den dansk-norske Søetat 1660–1814 og den danske Søetat 1814–1932 (Translates as: Officers of the Danish-Norwegian Naval Service 1660 -1814 and the Danish Naval Service 1814–1932). (Copenhagen: H. Gagerup).

External links
 

Ships of the line of the Royal Navy
Arrogant-class ships of the line
1779 ships